The Dujiangyan Phoenix Stadium is a multi-purpose stadium in Dujiangyan, Sichuan, China. It is currently used mostly for association football matches. The stadium holds 12,700 people. The venue broke ground in February 2008 with original name Dujiangyan Sports Centre Stadium. It opened in May 2010 with a new name "Phoenix", which was in memory of the city rebirth from 2008 Sichuan earthquake.

References

Football venues in China
Multi-purpose stadiums in China
Athletics (track and field) venues in China
2010 establishments in China
Buildings and structures in Chengdu
Sport in Chengdu
Sports venues in Sichuan
Sports venues completed in 2010